Patrick Lee Ryan (born September 16, 1955) is a former professional American football quarterback and is currently the football color analyst on the Vol Radio Network, broadcasting games for his alma mater, the University of Tennessee. He played 14 seasons in the National Football League for the New York Jets and the Philadelphia Eagles.

Biography
Ryan was born in Hutchinson, Kansas and attended Putnam High School in Oklahoma City, Oklahoma. He played college football at the University of Tennessee.

Ryan was drafted in the eleventh round of the 1978 NFL Draft by the New York Jets. He played professionally for thirteen seasons, twelve seasons with the New York Jets and one season with the Philadelphia Eagles.

Ryan was primarily a backup, seeing just fifteen snaps in his first four years. His one significant season was in 1984, when he started eleven games for the Jets. He went 6-5 while throwing fourteen touchdowns and fourteen interceptions for 1,939 yards. During the 1986-87 NFL playoffs, Ryan was the starting quarterback for the Jets against the Kansas City Chiefs in the Wild Card Round. Throwing three touchdown passes in the game, the Jets won 35-15 for their first playoff win in four years. The following week during the Divisional Round against the Cleveland Browns, Ryan threw a 42-yard touchdown on a flea-flicker to give the Jets a 7-0 1st quarter lead. However, he suffered an injury that knocked him out in the second quarter (leading to the return of Ken O'Brien, who had started the regular season as quarterback), and the Jets would ultimately lose this game 23-20 in double overtime, the third longest playoff game in NFL history at that time.

Life after the NFL
Ryan was employed as a color analyst on Tennessee Titans radio broadcasts from 1999 to 2004. He is now a home builder in Knoxville, Tennessee.  He later worked as a football analyst for the University of Tennessee's Vol Radio Network, cohosting the weekly "Big Orange Hotline," and joining Bob Kesling, Tim Priest, and John Wilkerson on the "Kickoff Call-In Show" prior to UT football games. In June 2021, Ryan became the color analyst for Tennessee Volunteers football following the announcement that Tim Priest would be retiring.

References

External links
 databasefootball.com
 NFL Enterprises LLC
 Pro-Football-Reference.com

1955 births
Living people
American football quarterbacks
National Football League announcers
New York Jets players
Sportspeople from Hutchinson, Kansas
Philadelphia Eagles players
Players of American football from Kansas
Tennessee Titans announcers
Tennessee Volunteers football players